Fabian Vasile Teușan (born 31 October 1988) is a Romanian football player, currently playing for 1. SVG Gumpoldskirchen.

References
 

1988 births
Living people
Sportspeople from Sibiu
Romanian footballers
CSM Jiul Petroșani players
FC Politehnica Timișoara players
CSM Reșița players
LPS HD Clinceni players
FC Gloria Buzău players
FC Universitatea Cluj players
FC Unirea Urziceni players
Association football midfielders